The Chesapeake and Ohio Greenbrier was a class of 12 4-8-4 "Greenbrier" type steam locomotives built by the Lima Locomotive Works between 1935 and 1948 and operated by the C&O. Like a handful of railroads, the C&O didn't name their 4-8-4s "Northerns", and instead went with the name "Greenbrier" after the Greenbrier Hotel in White Sulphur Springs, West Virginia, a major resort on the C&O mainline.

They were built with the primary purpose of hauling long, heavy, high speed express passenger trains for the C&O Railway such as the George Washington and the Fast Flying Virginian. All retired by the mid 1950s, only 614 survives and is on display.

History
Built in three batches, all 12 of the Greenbriers were built for fast passenger service, hauling trains such as the "George Washington" or the "Sportsman". They also saw service pulling freight and even in pusher service for eastbound coal trains.

First batch
The first batch consisted of five "Greenbriers" (600-604) and were built in 1935 and were named Virginia statesmen; Thomas Jefferson, Patrick Henry, Benjamin Harrison, James Madison and Edmund Randolph and classified as J-3. They were delivered with spoked driving wheels and 250 lbf/in2 boiler pressure. They were the only "Greenbriers" built with Walschaert valve gear.

Second batch
Only two were part of the second batch, built in 1942, numbered 605-606 and were also classified as J-3. They were also given Virginia statesmen names; Thomas Nelson, Jr and James Monroe. This batch was built with Baker valve gear and aside from the reverse domes, there were no major physical differences from the first batch. They also had a bit more boiler pressure, at 255 lbf/in2 and were the heaviest of the "Greenbriers".

Third batch
The final batch of "Greenbriers" were numbered 610-614 and were built in 1948 and classified as J-3a. They weren't named after any Virginia statesmen like the earlier batches, but they were among the most modern and efficient steam locomotives ever built, with Boxpok driving wheels, Timken roller bearings on every axle, including every tender axle, as well as on the main and side rods, crank pins, pistons, piston rods, and crossheads. No. 613 was also fitted with experimental smoke deflectors. Despite having a smaller heating surface than the earlier class J-3s, the class J-3as have firebox circulators, a larger combustion chamber and larger-diameter flues to accommodate the superheater tubes, improving their steaming capacity. They were also fitted with a streamlined pilot and were the last 4-8-4s built by Lima and were the last commercially built 4-8-4s.

Driving wheel size conflict
Lima Engineering Department records show every "Greenbrier" had 72 inch driving wheels. C&O diagrams of 1948, however, showed every "Greenbrier" with 74 inch driving wheels. This conflict was never resolved.

Preservation

Only one "Greenbrier" has survived into preservation, No. 614. 614 ran in a number of excursions, starting with the Chessie Safety Express in the early 1980s and ending pulling excursions in conjunction with New Jersey Transit (NJT) and co-sponsored by the Volunteer Railroaders Association between 1996 and 1998. No. 614 was also used as a test locomotive for the ACE 3000 project, hauling coal trains between Huntington and Hinton, West Virginia in 1985 and "T" was added next to her number to indicate testint. During 614's excursion career, her tender was modified, reducing its water capacity from 21,500 gallons to 18,200 gallons, but increased its coal capacity from 23 metric tons to 45 metric tons. To compensate the reduced water capacity, an auxiliary tender was given to 614, increasing her overall water capacity to 50,000 gallons, these changes increased distance traveled with fewer coal and water stops. Today, 614 is on display at the C&O Railway Heritage Center in Clifton Forge, Virginia in the Greenbrier Presidential Express scheme, a luxury passenger train which never came to be.

Roster

References

4-8-4 locomotives
Chesapeake and Ohio locomotives
Lima locomotives
Passenger locomotives
Railway locomotives introduced in 1935
Standard gauge locomotives of the United States
Preserved steam locomotives of Virginia